Thomas Green Davidson (August 3, 1805September 11, 1883) was a Democratic U.S. Representative from Louisiana. Shortly after Louisiana seceded from the Union in January 1861, Davidson vacated his seat.

Life and career 
Born at Coles Creek, Mississippi, Davidson completed preparatory studies.
He studied law.
He was admitted to the bar and commenced practice in Greensburg, Louisiana.
He was appointed register of the United States land office.
He served as member of the Louisiana House of Representatives from 1833–1846.

Davidson was elected as a Democrat to the 34th, 35th, and 36th Congresses (March 4, 1855March 3, 1861).
He resumed the practice of his profession.
He served as president of the Democratic State convention in 1855.
He served again in the Louisiana House of Representatives 1874—1878, 1880, and 1883.
He died in Springfield, Livingston Parish, Louisiana, September 11, 1883.
He was interred in Springfield Cemetery.

References

1805 births
1883 deaths
Democratic Party members of the Louisiana House of Representatives
Democratic Party members of the United States House of Representatives from Louisiana
19th-century American politicians
People from Greensburg, Louisiana